Federal Highway 76 (Carretera Federal 76) (Fed. 76) is a free (libre) part of the federal highways corridors (los corredores carreteros federales) of Mexico. The entire length of the highway is within Nayarit.

References

076